Palaau State Park is a state park located on the Hawaiian island of Molokai. The only state park on Molokai, it overlooks the settlement and former leper colony of Kalaupapa. The park includes campsites and a picnic shelter and features a hiking trail to a phallic fertility stone.

References

State parks of Hawaii
Protected areas of Molokai